Maryam University is a private university established in 2007, located in the Kabul city of the Kabul Province, Afghanistan.

Programs and Courses
 Bachelor in Law (LLB)
 Bachelor in Political Science (BPS)
 Bachelor in Business Administration (BBA)
 Bachelor in Information Technology (BIT)
 CEL/DEL in English Language

References

External links
Maryam University

Educational institutions established in 2007
Universities and colleges in Kabul
Universities in Afghanistan
2007 establishments in Afghanistan
Private universities in Afghanistan